Interleukin 3 receptor, alpha (low affinity) (IL3RA), also known as CD123 (Cluster of Differentiation 123), is a human gene.

Function 
The protein encoded by this gene is an interleukin 3 specific subunit of a heterodimeric cytokine receptor. The receptor is composed of a ligand specific alpha subunit and a signal transducing beta subunit shared by the receptors for interleukin 3 (IL3), colony stimulating factor 2 (CSF2/GM-CSF), and interleukin 5 (IL5). The binding of this protein to IL3 depends on the beta subunit. The beta subunit is activated by the ligand binding, and is required for the biological activities of IL3. This gene and the gene encoding the colony stimulating factor 2 receptor alpha chain (CSF2RA) form a cytokine receptor gene cluster in a X-Y pseudoautosomal region on chromosomes X or Y.

Interactions 
IL3RA has been shown to interact with Interleukin 3.

See also 
 Cluster of differentiation

References

Further reading

External links 
 

Clusters of differentiation